Raureka is a suburb of Hastings City, in the Hawke's Bay Region of New Zealand's North Island.

The suburb has three council-owned parks: Ebbett Park, St Leonards Park and Whenua Takoha Reserve. Raureka locals established a campaign in 2018 to stop the council selling part of Ebbett Park to developers.

Raureka has a community hub with community gardens based at Raureka School.

Demographics

Raureka had a population of 4,953 at the 2018 New Zealand census, an increase of 426 people (9.4%) since the 2013 census, and an increase of 354 people (7.7%) since the 2006 census. There were 1,722 households, comprising 2,427 males and 2,523 females, giving a sex ratio of 0.96 males per female, with 1,050 people (21.2%) aged under 15 years, 1,077 (21.7%) aged 15 to 29, 2,052 (41.4%) aged 30 to 64, and 771 (15.6%) aged 65 or older.

Ethnicities were 65.8% European/Pākehā, 28.8% Māori, 9.3% Pacific peoples, 8.6% Asian, and 1.6% other ethnicities. People may identify with more than one ethnicity.

The percentage of people born overseas was 18.7, compared with 27.1% nationally.

Although some people chose not to answer the census's question about religious affiliation, 45.7% had no religion, 38.5% were Christian, 3.0% had Māori religious beliefs, 1.5% were Hindu, 0.4% were Muslim, 1.0% were Buddhist and 3.5% had other religions.

Of those at least 15 years old, 483 (12.4%) people had a bachelor's or higher degree, and 939 (24.1%) people had no formal qualifications. 306 people (7.8%) earned over $70,000 compared to 17.2% nationally. The employment status of those at least 15 was that 1,911 (49.0%) people were employed full-time, 582 (14.9%) were part-time, and 195 (5.0%) were unemployed.

Education

References

Suburbs of Hastings, New Zealand